The LG Fiesta is an Android smartphone developed by LG Electronics that was launched in 2017. The phone has 16GB of internal storage and 1.5GB of RAM.  It is equipped with an impressive 4500 mAh battery and a forward facing flash.

Specifications

Hardware
The LG Fiesta is equipped with Android 7 Nougat. It has a 1.4 GHz Quad core and an Adreno 308 GPU. It has 16GB of internal storage, which can be expanded with a microSD card, up to 2TB, and 1.5GB of RAM. It comes with a 13 MP rear facing and 5 MP front facing camera, along with a front and back flash.

History
The phone was released in July 2017.

See also
LG Electronics
List of LG mobile phones
Android

References 

Mobile phones introduced in 2017
Android (operating system) devices